Gábor Novák (14 August 1934 – 5 August 2021) was a Hungarian sprint canoer who competed in the early 1950s. He won a silver medal in the C-1 10000 m event at the 1952 Summer Olympics in Helsinki.

References

External links
 
 
 
 

1934 births
2021 deaths
Canoeists at the 1952 Summer Olympics
Hungarian male canoeists
Olympic canoeists of Hungary
Olympic silver medalists for Hungary
Olympic medalists in canoeing
Medalists at the 1952 Summer Olympics
Canoeists from Budapest
20th-century Hungarian people